Legionella nautarum is a Gram-negative bacterium from the genus Legionella which was isolated from a hot water tap in London.

References

External links
Type strain of Legionella nautarum at BacDive -  the Bacterial Diversity Metadatabase

Legionellales
Bacteria described in 1993